A Tree Grows in Brooklyn may refer to:

A Tree Grows in Brooklyn (novel), a 1943 novel by Betty Smith
A Tree Grows in Brooklyn (1945 film), the cinema adaptation of the novel
A Tree Grows in Brooklyn (musical), the stage adaptation of the novel
A Tree Grows in Brooklyn (1974 film), a 1974 American TV film based on the novel